João Rafael de Barros Ferreira (born 17 March 1993) is a Brazilian professional volleyball player. At the professional club level, he plays for Tours VB.

Honours

Clubs
 National championships
 2020/2021  Brazilian SuperCup, with Vôlei Taubaté

Youth national team
 2011  U19 Pan American Cup 
 2012  CSV U21 South American Championship
 2012  U23 Pan American Cup

Individual awards
 2011: U19 Pan American Cup – Best Spiker
 2012: CSV U21 South American Championship – Most Valuable Player
 2012: CSV U21 South American Championship – Best Server
 2019: Italian Championship – Best Receiver

References

External links

 
 Player profile at LegaVolley.it 
 Player profile at Volleybox.net

1993 births
Living people
Brazilian men's volleyball players
Volleyball players at the 2015 Pan American Games
Pan American Games medalists in volleyball
Pan American Games silver medalists for Brazil
Medalists at the 2015 Pan American Games
Brazilian expatriate sportspeople in Italy
Expatriate volleyball players in Italy
Brazilian expatriate sportspeople in Qatar
Expatriate volleyball players in Qatar
Brazilian expatriate sportspeople in France
Expatriate volleyball players in France
Brazilian expatriate sportspeople in Egypt
Tours Volley-Ball players
Outside hitters
21st-century Brazilian people
Expatriate volleyball players in Egypt